The 2005–06 Alaska Aces season was the 20th season of the franchise in the Philippine Basketball Association (PBA).

Key dates
August 14: The 2005 PBA Draft took place in Sta. Lucia East Grand Mall, Cainta, Rizal.

Draft picks

Roster

Fiesta Conference

Game log

|- bgcolor="#bbffbb" 
| 1
| October 5
| Sta. Lucia
| 80–75
| 
| 
| 
| Araneta Coliseum
| 1–0
|- bgcolor="#edbebf" 
| 2
| October 9
| Red Bull
| 75–76
|  McClary (23)
| 
| 
| Araneta Coliseum
| 1–1
|- bgcolor="#edbebf" 
| 3
| October 14
| Purefoods
| 84–86 OT
| McClary (27)
| 
| 
| Cuneta Astrodome
| 1–2
|- bgcolor="#bbffbb" 
| 4
| October 19
| Brgy.Ginebra
| 102–72
| McClary (32)
| 
| 
| Araneta Coliseum
| 2–2
|- bgcolor="#bbffbb"
| 5
| October 21
| Air21
| 111–108 (2OT)
| Cariaso (22)
| 
| 
| Araneta Coliseum
| 3–2
|- bgcolor="#bbffbb"
| 6
| October 28
| Coca-Cola
| 
| 
| 
| 
| Cuneta Astrodome
| 4–2

|- bgcolor="#bbffbb" 
| 7
| November 2
| Red Bull
| 81–64
| McClary (31)
| 
| 
| Cuneta Astrodome
| 5–2
|- bgcolor="#edbebf" 
| 8
| November 6
| Talk 'N Text
| 79–101
| Cariaso (17)
| 
| 
| Araneta Coliseum
| 5–3
|- bgcolor="#edbebf" 
| 9
| November 13
| Coca-Cola
| 63–86
| McClary (17)
| 
| 
| Araneta Coliseum
| 5–4
|- bgcolor="#edbebf" 
| 10
| November 16
| Air21
| 83–88
| McClary (15)
| 
| 
| Araneta Coliseum
| 5–5
|- bgcolor="#edbebf" 
| 11
| November 19
| Purefoods
| 69–78
| 
| 
| 
| Lucena City
| 5–6
|- bgcolor="#edbebf" 
| 12
| November 23
| San Miguel
| 62–66
| 
| 
| 
| Araneta Coliseum
| 5–7

|- bgcolor="#bbffbb" 
| 13
| December 7
| Sta. Lucia
| 87–82
| Cariaso (17)
| 
| 
| Ynares Center
| 6–7
|- bgcolor="#edbebf" 
| 14
| December 17
| Talk 'N Text
| 84–92
| Bradley (23)
| 
| 
| Balanga, Bataan
| 6–8
|- bgcolor="#bbffbb" 
| 15
| December 21
| San Miguel
| 
| 
| 
| 
| Cuneta Astrodome
| 7–8
|- bgcolor="#edbebf" 
| 16
| December 25
| Brgy.Ginebra
| 89–96
| Bradley (34)
| 
| 
| Cuneta Astrodome
| 7–9

Transactions

Trades

Additions

Subtractions

References

Alaska Aces (PBA) seasons
Alaska